Alki Zei (Greek: Άλκη Ζέη) (December 15, 1925 – February 27, 2020) was a Greek novelist and children's writer.

Biography 
Zei was born in Athens. She studied in the philosophy school of Athens University, the Drama School of the Athens Odeion, and in the screenwriting department of the Moscow Cinema Institute. From 1954 to 1964 she lived in the Soviet Union as a political refugee. In 1964 she and her family returned to Greece, but they all left again when the junta seized power in 1967. That time she stayed in Paris, returning only after the dictatorship fell.

Alki Zei took up writing very young. During her early years at junior high school she started writing plays for puppet theatre. Her first novel, The Tiger in the Shop Window (a.k.a. Wildcat Under Glass), (1963) was inspired by her childhood spent in Samos and is semi-autobiographical. This was followed by a series of books for children, and in 1987 by her first novel for adults, Achilles Fiancee . Her books have been translated into numerous languages.

Her teenage novel Constantina and her spiders (a.k.a. Tina's Web) won the Greek IBBY prize for the best book for older children, and Alki Zei was nominated as a candidate for the 2004 Hans Christian Andersen Award for Writing and Astrid Lindgren Memorial Award for Literature. The Mildred L. Batchelder Award was granted for the translation to English and publishing in the United States of Wildcat Under Glass (1970), Petros' War (1974), and The Sound of the Dragon's Feet (1980).

Works
 The Purple Umbrella  [L'Ombre Mauve in French translation]
 Grandpa the liar (O Pseftis Pappous) 
 Near the railway tracks (Κοντά στις ράγες)
 The Tiger in the Shop Window (a.k.a. Wildcat Under Glass) / Το Καπλάνι της Βιτρίνας (1963)
 Petros' War / Ο μεγάλος περίπατος του Πέτρου (1971)
 Achilles' Fiancée / Η αρραβωνιαστικιά του Αχιλλέα (1987)  [English translation by G. Holst-Warhaft 1991]
 Uncle Plato / Ο θείος Πλάτων (1975)
 Hannibal's Shoes / Τα παπούτσια του Αννίβα (1979)
 Constantina and her spiders (a.k.a. Tina's Web) / Η Κωνσταντίνα και οι αράχνες της (2002)

 Awards 
 Literary Prize ("Prix Litéraire des Jeunes Européens", 2010 France) for Granda the liar''
Commandeur de l'Ordre des Arts et des Lettres, 2015 France
Gold Cross, Order of Honour, 2015 Greece

References

External links
 Alki Zei at Bookboom: the e-place for juvenile Greek literature
  (including 4 'from old catalog')

1925 births
2020 deaths
20th-century Greek women writers
National and Kapodistrian University of Athens alumni
Greek children's writers
Greek women novelists
Greek women children's writers
Commandeurs of the Ordre des Arts et des Lettres
Writers from Athens